Sibylle is a given name. It may refer to:

Anna Sibylle of Hanau-Lichtenberg (1542–1580), eldest surviving daughter of Count Philipp IV and Countess Eleonore of Fürstenberg
Duchess Magdalene Sibylle of Prussia (1586–1659), Electress of Saxony as the spouse of John George I, Elector of Saxony
Duchess Sibylle of Saxe-Lauenburg (1675–1733), Margravine of Baden-Baden
Magdalene Sibylle of Holstein-Gottorp (1631–1719), Duchess of Hostein-Gottorp by birth and by marriage Duchess of Mecklenburg-Güstrow
Magdalena Sibylle of Saxe-Weissenfels (1648–1681), German noblewoman
Magdalene Sibylle of Saxe-Weissenfels (1673–1726), German noblewoman
Magdalene Sibylle of Saxony (1617–1668), Princess of Denmark from 1634 to 1647 as the wife of Prince-Elect Christian of Denmark, and the Duchess consort of Saxe-Altenburg as the wife of Frederick Wilhelm II, Duke of Saxe-Altenburg
Margravine Magdalene Sibylle of Brandenburg-Bayreuth (1612–1687), Electress of Saxony from 1656 to 1680 as the wife of John George II
Sibylle Christine of Anhalt-Dessau (1603–1686), by birth a member of the House of Ascania and princess of Anhalt-Dessau. Through her two marriages, Countess of Hanau-Münzenberg and Hanau-Lichtenberg
Sibylle Elisabeth of Württemberg (1584-1606), German Princess member of the House of Württemberg and by marriage Duchess of Saxony
Sibylle of Baden (1485–1518), Margravine of Baden by birth and by marriage, Countess of Hanau-Lichtenberg
Sibylle of Bavaria (1489–1519), member of the House of Wittelsbach, princess of Bavaria-Munich and by marriage Electress Palatine
Sibylle of Brandenburg (1467–1524), Princess of Brandenburg by birth and by marriage Duchess of Jülich and Duchess of Berg
Sibylle of Cleves (1512–1554), Electress consort of Saxony
Sibylle of Jülich-Cleves-Berg, Margravine of Burgau (1557–1628), daughter of Duke William the Rich and Archduchess Maria of Austria
Sibylle of Saxony (1515–1592), Saxon princess of the Albertine line of House of Wettin and by marriage Duchess of Saxe-Lauenburg
Sibylle Riqueti de Mirabeau (1849–1932), Comtesse de Martel de Janville, French writer who wrote under the pseudonym Gyp
Sibylle Schwarz or Sibylla Schwarz, (1621–1638), German poet of the Baroque era
Sibylle Ursula von Braunschweig-Lüneburg (1629–1671), German translator and writer
Sibylle von Olfers (1881–1916), German art teacher and a nun

Contemporary 
Sibylle Berg (born 1962), German writer of novels, essays, short stories, and plays
Sibylle Bergemann (1941–2010), German photographer
Sibylle Blanc (born 1974), French-speaking Swiss actress and director in theatrical, film, television
Sibylle Boden-Gerstner (1920–2016), German costume designer, artist and fashion writer
Sibylle Brauner (born 1975), German alpine skier 
Sibylle Canonica (born 1957), Swiss actress
Sibylle Günter (born 1964), German theoretical physicist researching tokamak plasmas
Sibylle Lewitscharoff (born 1954), German author
Sibylle Kemmler-Sack (1934-1999), German chemist
Sibylle Laurischk (born 1954), German politician
Sibylle Matter (born 1973), Swiss athlete of the triathlon and physician 
Sibylle Pasche (born 1976), Swiss artist and sculptor
Sibylle Powarzynski (born 1968), German yacht racer
Sibylle Rauch (born 1960), German former film actress, nude model and pornographic actress

Others
Sibylle-class frigate, a class of five 32-gun sail frigates designed by Jacques-Noël Sané and built for the French Navy in the late 1770s
French ship Sibylle, a number of French ships
Sibylle, fashion magazine published in East Germany

See also
 Cybil (disambiguation)
 Sibyl (disambiguation)
 Sibylla (disambiguation)
 Sibille (disambiguation)

German feminine given names